The 1936 Cornell Big Red football team was an American football team that represented Cornell University during the 1936 college football season.  In their first season under head coach Carl Snavely, the Big Red compiled a 3–5 record and outscored their opponents by a combined total of 145 to 132.

Schedule

References

Cornell
Cornell Big Red football seasons
Cornell Big Red football